Trans World Express (TWE) was the fully owned and certificated, regional carrier for Trans World Airlines (TWA) and an airline trademark name for TWA's corporation. 

 Trans World Express - The formerly independent regional airline known as Ransome Airlines previously owned by Pan Am (PA) before its purchase by the Trans World Corporation for TWA. 
 TWE - the outsourced carriers flying as Trans World Express:
Air Midwest
 Alpha Air
Trans States Airlines 
Metro Air Northeast

When American Airlines bought TWA, the regional airlines functioning under the Trans World Express "banner" became affiliated with American Airlines under the name and new banner air carrier branding AmericanConnection. Trans World Express service at that time was being provided by Trans States Airlines, Chautauqua Airlines, and Corporate Airlines (later RegionsAir).

History
Until November 6, 1995, TWE, Inc., a wholly owned subsidiary of TWA, operated flights under the Trans World Express banner. This fully certificated airline, previously named and certificated as Ransome Airlines - Pan Am Express, was headquartered at Philadelphia Northeast Airport far from TWA's (John F. Kennedy International Airport and (STL) St Louis hubs. 

After that date, November 6, 1995, TWA outsourced all TWE operations to third-party "banner" airlines.  Other airlines previously operating under the name and TWE "banner" included Resort Air and Metro Air Northeast.

Most flights were from the Eastern Seaboard to New York's John F. Kennedy International Airport or from the South and Midwest to Lambert-Saint Louis International Airport.

In 1993, Alpha Air was operating Trans World Express service with Beechcraft 1900C turboprops from a hub at Los Angeles International Airport (LAX) with service to Burbank (BUR), Grand Canyon (GCN), Lake Tahoe (TVL), Mammoth Lakes (MMH), Palm Springs (PSP), Phoenix (PHX) and Santa Ana/Orange County Airport (SNA, now John Wayne Airport).

Fleet

The following aircraft were contracted and operating in the TWExpress system at the time of TWA's merger with American Airlines and the TWExpress brand was discontinued: 
Embraer ERJ-145 
ATR-72 
ATR-42 
Jetstream 41
Jetstream 31/32

Other aircraft that appeared in TWE colors included: 
Beechcraft 1900C
Saab 340 
de Havilland Canada DHC-7 Dash 7 
de Havilland Canada DHC-6 Twin Otter 
Fairchild Metro II/III
CASA C-212 Aviocar
EMB-120 Brasilia

Destinations at closure
Trans World Express, via flights operated by Trans States Airlines, Corporate Airlines and Chautauqua Airlines, was serving the following destinations when the Trans World Express code share service was halted:

Canada
Ontario
 Toronto (Lester B. Pearson International Airport)

United States
Arkansas
 Bentonville/Fayetteville (Northwest Arkansas Regional Airport)
Illinois
 Bloomington/Normal (Central Illinois Regional Airport)
 Champaign/Urbana (University of Illinois Willard Airport)
 Decatur (Decatur Airport)
 Marion (Williamson County Regional Airport)
 Moline (Quad City International Airport)
 Peoria (Greater Peoria Regional Airport)
 Quincy (Quincy Regional Airport)
 Springfield (Abraham Lincoln Capital Airport)
Indiana
 Evansville (Evansville Regional Airport)
 Fort Wayne (Fort Wayne International Airport)
 Indianapolis (Indianapolis International Airport)
 South Bend (South Bend Regional Airport)
Iowa
 Burlington (Southeast Iowa Regional Airport)
 Cedar Rapids (The Eastern Iowa Airport)
 Sioux City (Sioux Gateway Airport)
 Waterloo (Waterloo Regional Airport)
Kentucky
 Cincinnati, Ohio area (Cincinnati-Northern Kentucky International Airport)
 Lexington (Blue Grass Regional Airport)
 Owensboro (Owensboro-Daviess County Regional Airport)
 Paducah (Barkley Regional Airport)
Louisiana
 Shreveport (Shreveport Regional Airport)
Michigan
 Grand Rapids (Gerald R. Ford International Airport)
Minnesota
 Rochester (Rochester International Airport)
Mississippi
 Jackson (Jackson-Evers International Airport)
Missouri
 Cape Girardeau (Cape Girardeau Regional Airport)
 Columbia (Columbia Regional Airport)
 Fort Leonard Wood (Waynesville Regional Airport at Forney Field)
 Joplin (Joplin Regional Airport)
 Kirksville (Kirksville Regional Airport)
 Springfield/Branson (Springfield-Branson National Airport)
 St. Louis (Lambert-St. Louis International Airport) Hub
Nebraska
 Lincoln (Lincoln Airport)
Ohio (for Cincinnati, see Kentucky)
 Dayton (Dayton International Airport)
South Carolina
 Charleston (Charleston International Airport)
 Greenville-Spartanburg (Greenville-Spartanburg International Airport)
Tennessee
 Jackson (McKellar-Sipes Regional Airport)
 Knoxville (McGhee Tyson Airport)
 Memphis (Memphis International Airport)
 Nashville (Nashville International Airport)
Wisconsin
 Madison (Dane County Regional Airport)

Previous destinations

United States
Alabama
 Birmingham (Birmingham International Airport)
Arizona
 Grand Canyon (Grand Canyon National Park Airport)
 Phoenix (Phoenix Sky Harbor International Airport)
Arkansas
 Fort Smith (Fort Smith Regional Airport)
 Harrison (Boone County Regional Airport)
 Little Rock (Clinton National Airport)
California
 Burbank (now Hollywood-Burbank Airport)
 Inyokern (Inyokern Airport)
 Lake Tahoe (Lake Tahoe Airport)
 Los Angeles (Los Angeles International Airport) - Hub  (at the time of the acquisition of Trans World Airlines by American Airlines in 2001, both TWA and Trans World Connection operated by American Eagle were serving Los Angeles.   Alpha Air earlier served LAX as Trans World Express.)
 Mammoth Lakes (Mammoth Yosemite Airport)
 Oxnard (Oxnard Airport)
 Palm Springs (Palm Springs International Airport) (At the time of TWA's end in 2001 Trans World Connection served Palm Springs )
 Palmdale (LA/Palmdale Regional Airport)
 Santa Ana/Orange County Airport (now John Wayne Airport) (at the time of TWA's end in 2001 both the mainline airline and Trans World Connection operated by American Eagle served Orange County.   Alpha Air earlier served Orange County Airport as Trans World Express.)
Connecticut
 Hartford (Bradley International Airport) (At the time of TWA's end in 2001 both the mainline airline and Trans World Connection served Hartford )
Illinois
 Chicago (Midway Airport) (At the time of TWA's end in 2001 the mainline airline served nearby O'Hare International Airport in Chicago )
Kentucky
 Louisville (Standiford Field) (At the time of TWA's end in 2001 the mainline airline served Louisville )
Maine
 Portland (Portland International Jetport)
Maryland
 Baltimore (Baltimore-Washington International Airport) (At the time of TWA's end in 2001 both the mainline airline and Trans World Connection served Baltimore )
Massachusetts
 Boston (Logan International Airport) (At the time of TWA's end in 2001 both the mainline airline and Trans World Connection served Boston )
Missouri
 Lake of the Ozarks (Lee C. Fine Memorial Airport)
New Hampshire
 Manchester (Manchester-Boston Regional Airport)
New York
 Albany (Albany International Airport) (At the time of TWA's end in 2001 Trans World Connection served Albany )
 Binghamton (Greater Binghamton Airport)
 Buffalo (Buffalo Niagara International Airport) (At the time of TWA's end in 2001 Trans World Connection served Buffalo )
 Ithaca (Ithaca Tompkins Regional Airport)
 New York City (At the time of TWA's end in 2001 both the mainline airline and Trans World Connection served New York City )
 John F. Kennedy International Airport - Hub
 LaGuardia Airport - Hub
 Newburgh (Stewart International Airport)
 Rochester (Greater Rochester International Airport)  (At the time of TWA's end in 2001 Trans World Connection served Rochester )
 Syracuse (Syracuse Hancock International Airport) (At the time of TWA's end in 2001 Trans World Connection served Syracuse )
Pennsylvania
 Harrisburg (Harrisburg International Airport)
 Pittsburgh (Pittsburgh International Airport) (At the time of TWA's end in 2001 both the mainline airline and Trans World Connection served Pittsburgh )
 Wilkes-Barre/Scranton (Wilkes-Barre/Scranton International Airport)
Rhode Island
 Providence (T. F. Green Airport) (At the time of TWA's end in 2001 Trans World Connection served Providence )
Virginia
 Norfolk/Virginia Beach/Williamsburg (Norfolk International Airport) (At the time of TWA's end in 2001 the mainline airline served Norfolk )
 Richmond (Richmond International Airport) (At the time of TWA's end in 2001 the mainline airline served Richmond )
 Washington, DC area (At the time of TWA's end in 2001 both the mainline airline and Trans World Connection served Washington, DC )

See also 
 List of defunct airlines of the United States

References

External links

Defunct airlines of the United States
Defunct regional airline brands
Trans World Airlines